The Alvis Salamander is a six-wheel drive  airport crash tender with off-road capabilities, developed in 1956.

It shares the same common Alvis six-wheel-drive chassis and other components with the FV 601 Saladin armoured car and FV 603 Saracen armoured personnel carrier. In turn it led to the FV 620 Stalwart load carrier which was derived from the Salamander.

Fire fighting equipment was provided by The Pyrene Company Limited. It could produce 7,500 gallons of foam per minute and carried a crew of 6. 

125 Salamanders were built and used in the Royal Air Force (as the Alvis Salamander/Pyrene Mark 6) and the Royal Canadian Air Force. From the late 1970s on they were replaced by vehicles like the Thornycroft Nubian Pyrene Mark 7.

References

Fire service vehicles
Military vehicles of the United Kingdom
Off-road vehicles
Salamander
Aircraft rescue and firefighting